Beverly Montgomery is a former American politician from Idaho. Montgomery was a Republican member of Idaho House of Representatives.

Early life 
Montgomery's parents were Robert G. Wallace and Thelma Halferty Wallace. Montgomery's grandfathers Robert Halferty and Frank Wallace both served in the Idaho legislature.

Career 
On November 3, 1998, Montgomery won the election and became a Republican member of Idaho House of Representatives for District 10, seat A. Montgomery defeated Loren Dale Kenyon with 69.2% of the votes. On November 7, 2000, as an incumbent, Montgomery won the election unopposed and continued serving District 10, seat A.

Personal life 
In 2015, Montgomery's sister Kitty Gurnsey, also a politician, died.

References

External links 
 Beverly Montgomery at books.google.com
 Beverly Montgomery at swingstateproject.com (2006)
 Montgomery floor sponsor of Bill H562

Living people
Republican Party members of the Idaho House of Representatives
Women state legislators in Idaho
Year of birth missing (living people)
21st-century American women